This is a list of sister cities in the United States state of Ohio. Sister cities, known in Europe as twin towns, are cities which partner with each other to promote human contact and cultural links, although this partnering is not limited to cities and often includes counties, regions, states and other sub-national entities.

Many Ohio jurisdictions work with foreign cities through Sister Cities International, an organization whose goal is to "promote peace through mutual respect, understanding, and cooperation."

A
Akron

 Chemnitz, Germany
 Kiryat Ekron, Israel

B
Bellefontaine
 Suzuka, Japan

Blue Ash
 Ilmenau, Germany

Bowling Green

 Protvino, Russia
 St. Thomas, Canada

Brunswick
 Razgrad, Bulgaria

C
Celina
 Minamiawaji, Japan

Centerville

 Bad Zwischenahn, Germany
 Waterloo, Canada

Chillicothe

 Azov, Russia
 Córdoba, Mexico

Cincinnati

 Amman, Jordan
 Gifu, Japan
 Harare, Zimbabwe
 Kharkiv, Ukraine
 Liuzhou, China
 Munich, Germany
 Mysore, India
 Nancy, France
 New Taipei, Taiwan

Cleveland

 Alexandria, Egypt
 Bahir Dar, Ethiopia
 Bangalore, India
 Beit She'an, Israel
 Brașov, Romania
 Bratislava, Slovakia

 Conakry, Guinea
 Fier Albania
 Gdańsk, Poland

 Holon, Israel
 Ibadan, Nigeria
 Klaipėda, Lithuania
 Lima, Peru
 Ljubljana, Slovenia
 County Mayo, Ireland
 Miskolc, Hungary
 Rouen, France
 Segundo Montes, El Salvador
 Taipei, Taiwan
 Vicenza, Italy
 Volgograd, Russia

Cleveland Heights
 Volzhsky, Russia

Columbus

 Accra, Ghana
 Ahmedabad, India
 Curitiba, Brazil
 Dresden, Germany
 Genoa, Italy
 Hefei, China
 Herzliya, Israel
 Odense, Denmark
 Seville, Spain
 Tainan, Taiwan

D
Dayton

 Augsburg, Germany
 Holon, Israel
 Monrovia, Liberia
 Ōiso, Japan
 Rushmoor, England, United Kingdom
 Salfit, Palestine
 Sarajevo, Bosnia and Herzegovina

Delaware

 Baumholder, Germany
 Omutninsk, Russia
 Sakata, Japan

Delphos
 Verl, Germany

E
East Liverpool
 Stoke-on-Trent, England, United Kingdom

Englewood
 Billerbeck, Germany

Euclid
 Naraha, Japan

F
Fremont
 Villa Hayes, Paraguay

G
Green
 Beiuș, Romania

Grove City
 Lübtheen, Germany

H
Huber Heights
 Rheinsberg, Germany

Hudson
 Landsberg am Lech, Germany

K
Kent
 Dudince, Slovakia

Kettering

 Kettering, England, United Kingdom
 Steyr, Austria

L
Lima
 Harima, Japan

M
Mansfield

 Mansfield, England, United Kingdom
 Tamura, Japan

Marysville
 Yorii, Japan

Miamisburg
 Owen Sound, Canada

Middletown
 Ōsaki, Japan

Milan
 Yawata, Japan

Montgomery
 Neuilly-Plaisance, France

N
New Knoxville
 Ladbergen, Germany

O
Oakwood

 Outremont (Montreal), Canada
 Le Vésinet, France

Oberlin
 Ifẹ, Nigeria

Oxford
 Differdange, Luxembourg

P
Portsmouth

 Great Corby, England, United Kingdom
 Orizaba, Mexico
 Zittau, Germany

R
Richfield
 Wolfach, Germany

S
Shaker Heights
 Volzhsky, Russia

South Euclid
 Kraljevo, Serbia

Springfield

 Casey, Australia
 Kragujevac, Serbia
 Pitești, Romania
 Wittenberg, Germany

St. Marys

 Awaji, Japan
 Lienen, Germany

Sylvania
 Woodstock, Canada

T
Toledo

 Coburg, Germany
 Coimbatore, India

 Hyderabad, Pakistan
 Londrina, Brazil
 Nanchong, China
 Poznań, Poland
 Qinhuangdao, China
 Szeged, Hungary
 Tanga, Tanzania
 Toledo, Spain
 Toyohashi, Japan

Troy
 Takahashi, Japan

V
Van Wert
 Sumoto, Japan

Vandalia

 Lichtenfels, Germany
 Prestwick, Scotland, United Kingdom

Vermilion
 Paimpol, France

W
Wapakoneta
 Lengerich, Germany

Warren
 Acre, Israel

Wellington
 Crieff, Scotland, United Kingdom

West Carrollton
 Vidin, Bulgaria

Westlake

 Kingsville, Canada
 Tralee, Ireland

Worthington
 Sayama, Japan

Wooster
 Collepietro, Italy

Y
Yellow Springs
 El Jícaro, Nicaragua

Youngstown

 Acre, Israel
 Spišská Nová Ves, Slovakia

References

Sister cities in Ohio
Populated places in Ohio
Ohio
Cities in Ohio